John Baynard was an Irish Anglican priest in the 17th century: a Non Juror, 
he was Archdeacon of Connor from 1771 to 1789, when he refused to take the oath of allegiance to William and Mary.

References

17th-century Irish Anglican priests
Archdeacons of Connor